Jacques Rennes (9 October 1875 – 3 August 1970) was a French philosopher and veterinarian.

People from Saintes, Charente-Maritime
1875 births
1970 deaths
20th-century French non-fiction writers
French trade unionists
French veterinarians
20th-century French male writers